Melanie Myrand (born 7 October 1985) is a Canadian athlete. She competed in the women's marathon event at the 2019 World Athletics Championships.

Career
Myrand started road racing in 2014. She participated in a 5km (17:44) and in the Montreal Marathon where she did 3:04 to finish in 3rd place. She then specialized on the track to make a comeback on the road in 2017. She did two half-marathons; in Calgary she finished in 1 h 19 min 49 s and took 3rd place, and in Philadelphia, she beat her personal best with a time of 1 h 17. After that, she participated in her second marathon, the Scotiabank Toronto Marathon. She achieved a time of 2 h 39 min 10 s, removing 23 min from her personal best. 

In 2018, she beat her half-marathon personal best in Houston with a time of 1 h 15 min, and beat her marathon record in Chicago with a time of 2 h 34 min 08 s. In 2019, she failed to break her half-marathon record at the Canadian Championships, but broke her marathon record with a time of 2 h 33 min 20 s in Rotterdam. She participated in the World Marathon Championships in 2019. She ran a 10k personal best on the track, in 2020, running 33 minutes and 42 seconds.

Personal Best

References

External links
 
 

1985 births
Living people
Canadian female long-distance runners
Canadian female marathon runners
Place of birth missing (living people)
World Athletics Championships athletes for Canada